The 1999 Penn Quakers football team represented the University of Pennsylvania in the 1999 NCAA Division I-AA football season. Penn compiled a 5–5 record (4–3 conference record) and placed fourth in the Ivy League.

Schedule

References

Penn
Penn Quakers football seasons
Penn Quakers football